Andrianovka is a rural locality (a village) in Aksyonovsky Selsoviet, Alsheyevsky District, Bashkortostan, Russia. The population was 53 as of 2010. There are 2 streets.

Geography 
Andrianovka is located 34 km southwest of Rayevsky (the district's administrative centre) by road. Khanzharovo is the nearest rural locality.

References 

Rural localities in Alsheyevsky District